Vasilios Andrianopoulos (1908 – 1989) was a Greek footballer. He was Giannis Andrianopoulos' brother.

Andrianopoulos started his career with Peiraikos Syndesmos FC and continued with the Athletic and Football Club of Piraeus, Olympiakos Omilos and Olympiacos F.C., as each of his prior clubs were absorbed into the next. He scored 92 goals in 161 official and unofficial matches for the club.

He was capped 7 times by the Greece National Football Team, scoring 3 goals. After his playing career, Vasilis took on various official football capacities.

He died in Piraeus in 1989.

References

External links
Πρόσωπα του Πειραιά (Faces of Piraeus)

1900s births
1989 deaths
Greece international footballers
Olympiacos F.C. players
Football articles needing expert attention
Footballers from Piraeus
Association football forwards
Greek footballers